Adam Cooper (born 22 July 1971) is an English actor, choreographer, dancer and theatre director. He works as both a performer and choreographer in musical theatre, and has choreographed and/or starred in award-winning shows such as On Your Toes, Singin' in the Rain and Grand Hotel. He began his professional career as a dancer of classical ballet and contemporary ballet and is a former Principal of the Royal Ballet, a major international ballet company based in London. He became internationally recognized for creating the lead role of Swan/Stranger in Matthew Bourne's contemporary dance production of the ballet Swan Lake, a role that was briefly featured in the 2000 film Billy Elliot where Cooper played the adult version of the titular character.

Biography

Adam Cooper was born 22 July 1971 in Tooting, London to a musician father and a social worker mother. He has an older brother, Simon Cooper, who is also a dancer and they trained at the same schools. From a young age, he and his brother studied tap and ballet at the Jean Winkler School of Dance in Tooting. They also played various musical instruments and sang in a choir. At age 11, Cooper won a place at ArtsEd, a specialist performing arts school in London where he studied classical ballet, character, modern, tap, jazz and contemporary dance, as well as singing, acting and stage combat. After completing his secondary education at the school, aged 16, he was accepted into the Royal Ballet Upper School.
At his graduation performance he played the lead role of Young Man in Ashton's the Two Pigeons.

Cooper married Sarah Wildor in 2000. She was a principal dancer with the Royal Ballet. and has become an Olivier-nominated actress. Their first daughter, Naomi, was born in 2008 and they now have a younger son named Alexander.

Dance

Royal Ballet

In 1989 Cooper joined the Royal Ballet and was quickly promoted to First Artist and Soloist in 1991, First Soloist 1993 and Principal Dancer in 1994. He was recognized for his performances in the classic as well as dramatic and contemporary ballet works, and he excelled in playing cruel but sexy villains. While with the Royal Ballet he worked extensively with choreographers Kenneth MacMillan and William Tuckett partnering all the leading ballerinas of the company including Sylvie Guillem and Darcey Bussell. He also performed works choreographed by George Balanchine, Ashley Page, Fokine, Bronislava Nijinska, Mikhail Baryshnikov, Christopher Wheeldon, Matthew Hart, and William Forsythe. He left the Royal Ballet in 1997 to freelance and expand his career opportunities.

Adventures in Motion Pictures

In 1995 Matthew Bourne recruited Cooper to join Adventures in Motion Pictures (now renamed New Adventures) for his radically re-interpreted production of Swan Lake. Together they created the basic Swan movement motifs and Cooper also contributed to the choreography. Cooper performed the dual Swan/Stranger role (the analog of the white and black swan in the classic version) all over the world and his performances won him international acclaim, multiple awards and a strong fan following. Cooper's performance was described as one of "tremendous excitement, subtlety,emotional depth and sheer sexiness". The popular press embraced him and his photo appeared in many magazines.

For his performances as the Swan/Stranger he received the Time Out Award in 1995, the Evening Standard Dance Award in 1997 and the 1999 Astaire Award for Best Dancer. He was also nominated for the 1999 Tony Award for Best Actor in a Musical. He appeared briefly at the end of the 2000 film Billy Elliot as the adult version of the title character, who is seen performing the role of the Swan. A DVD recording of the Swan Lake with Cooper and the original cast was issued in 1996 and can be seen on Youtube.com. Excerpts from Swan Lake (Bourne) appeared on the 1998 Royal Variety TV program and he repeated his Swan/Stranger role for the TV audience. His performance in the Billy Elliot film and in the Swan Lake (Bourne) DVD inspired at least one of the boys playing Billy Elliot in the stage production to join New Adventures in the hopes of performing The Swan role. In 2003 Cooper once again played the Swan/Stranger when AMP toured in Japan, and there was enormous enthusiasm for his performance and he acquired a large number of new fans.

In 1997 Cooper was invited by Bourne to take part in the initial planning of AMP's next show, Cinderella. This version of the dance took place in London during the Blitz, but used the same Prokofiev music as the classic version Cinderella (Prokofiev). Cooper helped to create and performed the role of Pilot (the Prince analog) in the initial 1997 London run and also played the Angel (the Godmother analog), and Sarah Wildor was his partner when she played the title role.
The production was also performed in Los Angeles in 1999.

Freelance dancer and choreographer

In 1998 Cooper worked with the Scottish Ballet to choreograph Just Scratching the Surface. He also performed the Hoffmann role in their production of Tales of Hoffmann. Since then he has gone on to choreograph for other ballet companies and for musical theatre.

Cooper appeared as a dancer and choreographer at the Exeter Festival for 3 years, heading evenings of dance co-produced with Iain Webb. In 2002 Cooper and Sarah Wildor presented a tribute to Sir Kenneth MacMillan at Exeter and in Japan. The Adam Cooper Company represented the UK at the Washington International Ballet Festival in 2003 performing a revival of Sir Kenneth MacMillan's Sea of Troubles.

Cooper has frequently danced as a guest artist with the Royal Ballet since leaving the company, performing lead roles in Romeo and Juliet, Ondine and Onegin. and others. In 2002 he created the role of Badger in William Tuckett's Wind in the Willows. In 2004 created the title role in Tuckett's The Soldier's Tale, which he reprised in 2005 and later performed in Japan in 2009 and 2015.

In 2005 he realized a long-held vision with his own production of Les Liaisons dangereuses, a mixture of theater and dance. Co-directed and designed by Lez Brotherston, the production was choreographed by Cooper and he also played the lead role of Viscomte de Valmont. The piece premiered in Japan early in the year before a summer season at Sadler's Wells, with a cast which included Simon Cooper and Sarah Wildor.

In 2009 Cooper joined Russell Maliphant to dance in Maliphant's 2:4:10 contemporary dance program- an evening of works celebrating Maliphant's 10 years as a choreographer.

Musical theatre

2002 to 2010

In Cooper's first venture into the musical theatre he was both the choreographer and actor (playing the lead role of Junior Dolan) in On Your Toes. In 2002 it played at Leicester Haymarket, and was in transferred in 2003 to the Royal Festival in the West End of London. Sarah Wildor joined the production in 2003 to play the role of Vera Baronova. He was lauded by both the critics and the audience for his contributions and was rewarded with the Critics' Circle National Dance Award for Best Choreography and Most Popular Dancer. In 2004 the production also had a successful tour in Japan.

In 2002 Cooper provided the choreography for the Swedish production of Garbo-the Musical. Cooper also played the lead role of Don Lockwood and choreographed Paul Kerryson's Singin' in the Rain in 2004 at Sadler's Wells Theatre, Leicester Haymarket, and was nominated for Critic's Circle Award for Choreography of a Musical. He was nominated for a Laurence Olivier Award for his choreography of the 2004 Grand Hotel for The Donmar Warehouse. The production won the 2005 Olivier Award in the category of Outstanding Musical Production.

In 2005, Cooper and Wildor performed a two-person play, Wallflowering, at the Seven Oaks Playhouse. Their roles were primarily dialogue with intermittent bits of ballroom dancing. Following this, he designed the choreography for the revival of Promises, Promises at Sheffield's Crucible Theatre.

In 2006 Cooper appeared alongside Neil Morrissey and Patrick Swayze playing Sky Masterson in Guys and Dolls at The Piccadilly Theatre, London and in 2007 he provided the musical staging for Side by Side by Sondheim for The Venue Theatre, London.

2008 saw Cooper's return to the stage, creating the role of Ramon in Zorro the Musical for the UK tour. He also played the Tin Man in the Royal Festival Hall's summer staging of the musical The Wizard of Oz, after which he turned his attention back to choreography. First, he choreographed Carousel for director Lindsay Posner which had a very successful UK tour and West End run at the Savoy Theatre. Then Cooper was asked by Paul Kerryson to direct and choreograph the first new show, Simply Cinderella, at the brand new Curve Theatre, Leicester.

In 2009 Cooper unveiled Shall We Dance at Sadler's Wells, an ambitious all-dance show based on Richard Rodgers' songs. For this production he was the box-office star, director, creator, librettist and choreographer. Later that year, he provided choreography for Lindsay Posner's production of the Donizetti opera Roberto Devereux at the Holland Park Theatre, Kensington, London.

Cooper co-starred in the touring stage version of Irving Berlin's White Christmas during the Christmas season in 2009 2010 and 2011. He played the role of Phil Davis.

2011 to the present

Cooper was the above-the-title star playing the role of Don Lockwood in Jonathan Church's highly successful 2011–2013 production of Singin' in the Rain, with choreography by Andrew Wright. Its first sold-out run was at the Chichester Festival Theatre and then a longer run at West End's Palace Theatre. He also performed the iconic Singin' in the Rain scene on the 2011 Royal Variety Performance TV show. The stage show was nominated for the Best Musical Revival and several other Laurence Olivier and other awards. A cast recording of Singin' in the Rain was issued in 2012. Good Mornin''' was performed at the 2012 Olivier Awards Ceremony. The show, starring Cooper, played in Japan for three weeks of November 2014.

In 2013 Cooper choreographed Matthew White's well-received production of Candide at the Menier Chocolate Factory. Reviewer Sam Smith wrote "Adam Cooper's choreography is racy, and the production finds a particular affinity with the 'Surrealism' of the piece." In late 2013 Cooper was invited to Denmark to choreograph Daniel Bohr's Danish language version of Evita at the Det Ny Teater (The New Theater) in Copenhagen. The show premiered in January 2014. For Evita, Adam Cooper created a choreography with continuous tango elements merged into the rest of the dance.

Cooper provided the "energetic" 60's choreography for Sunny Afternoon Musical at the Hampstead Theatre in London. The show ran from April to end of May in 2014 and then in October 2014 it transferred to The Harold Pinter Theatre (formerly The Comedy Theatre) 
at the West End. Its run was extended several times due to its popularity with the audience and positive critical reviews. It was nominated for numerous awards and won 4 Olivier Awards in 2015. Details are at Sunny Afternoon.

Cooper had another opportunity to present a stage version of Les Liaisons dangereuses (Gefährliche Liebschaften) in 2015.  He choreographed and co-directed with Josef E. Köpplinger a German musical version of the novel with a newly commissioned book, lyrics and score for the itinerant Staatstheater am Gärtnerplatz company in Munich, Germany.

In 2019, Cooper appeared in the UK Tour of New Adventures' The Red Shoes, playing the role of Boris Lermontov. 

Films and TVThe Soldier's Tale (2010) TV Movie (The Soldier)
 Bourne to Dance (2001) TV Movie (himself)
 Billy Elliot (2000) Arts Council of England, BBC Films, Working Title Films (Billy, Aged 25)
 Madame Bovary (2000) TV Movie (Vicomte)
 The Sandman (2000) Channel 4 TV Movie
 Jason and the Argonauts (2000) Hallmark Entertainment & Panfilm TV Movie (Eros)
 Dance Ballerina Dance (1998) BBC2 TV (himself)
 Swan Lake (Bourne) (1998) PBS Great Performances TV Series with Adventures in Motion Pictures (Swan/Stranger)
 Royal Variety Performance TV Show (1998) Excerpts from Swan Lake (Bourne) (Swan/Stranger)
 The South Bank show: Matthew Bourne's Adventures in Motion Pictures (1997) TV Documentary (himself)
 Swan Lake (Bourne) (1996) BBC/NVC with Adventures in Motion Pictures (Swan/Stranger)
 Mayerling (ballet) (1994) BBC with the Royal Ballet (Hungarian officer)
 Gala Tribute to Tchaikovsky (1993) TV Special (Principal Dancer)
 Winter Dreams (1992) BBC TV with the Royal Ballet (Staff Captain Vassily Vasilyevich Solyony)
 La Bayadère, The Sleeping Beauty (ballet), Winter Gala with Royal Ballet for BBC TV
 Prince of the Pagodas (1990) with the Royal Ballet
 Merry Wives of Windsor (1982) BBC TV (fairy)

Other
(2000) National Portrait Gallery (London), portrait of Adam Cooper by Stuart Pearson Wright
oil on gesso on oak panel, NPG 6542
(2014) Imperial Classical Ballet Faculty Patrons, Adam Cooper and Sarah Wildor

Awards
(1988) Ursula Moreton Choreographic Competition
(1989) Professional Level Prize @ Prix de Lausanne
(1996) Time Out Award for Best Performance in AMP's Swan Lake(1997) Evening Standard Award for his performance as The Swan in AMP's Swan Lake(1997) Drama League Award for Best Performance as The Swan in AMP's Swan Lake (Los Angeles Season)
(1999) Astaire Award for outstanding Male Dancer for his performance as The Swan in AMP's Swan Lake(1999) Nominated for Best Actor in a Musical Tony Award for the Broadway Season of Swan Lake(2002) Nominated for Best Male Dancer by the Critics' Circle National Dance Awards for his performances with the Royal Ballet and On Your Toes.
(2003) Critics' Circle National Dance Awards for Best Choreography for On Your Toes(2003) Critics' Circle National Dance Awards for Most Popular Dancer.
(2003) Nominated for Whatsonstage.com Theatregoers' Choice Awards – for Best Choreographer and Best Actor in a Musical for On Your Toes(2004) Nominated by Critics' Circle National Dance Awards for Best Choreography (Musical Theater) for Singin' in the Rain(2005) Nominated for What's Onstage Award for choreography of the 2004 Grand Hotel for The Donmar Warehouse.
(2005) Nominated for a Laurence Olivier Award for choreography of the 2004 Grand Hotel for The Donmar Warehouse.
(2013) Nominated for What's Onstage Award as Best Actor in a Musical for Singin in the Rain''

References

External links
 Official website

Living people
People from Tooting
People educated at the Arts Educational Schools
People educated at the Royal Ballet School
English male ballet dancers
Dancers of The Royal Ballet
1971 births
National Dance Award winners